Joseph II (German: Josef Benedikt Anton Michael Adam; English: Joseph Benedict Anthony Michael Adam; 13 March 1741 – 20 February 1790) was Holy Roman Emperor from 18 August 1765 and sole ruler of the Habsburg lands from 29 November 1780 until his death. He was the eldest son of Empress Maria Theresa and her husband, Emperor Francis I, and the brother of Marie Antoinette, Maria Carolina of Austria and Maria Amalia, Duchess of Parma. He was thus the first ruler in the Austrian dominions of the union of the Houses of Habsburg and Lorraine, styled Habsburg-Lorraine. 

Joseph was a proponent of enlightened absolutism; however, his commitment to secularizing, liberalizing and modernizing reforms resulted in significant opposition, which resulted in failure to fully implement his programs.  Meanwhile, despite making some territorial gains, his reckless foreign policy badly isolated Austria. He has been ranked with Catherine the Great of Russia and Frederick the Great of Prussia as one of the three great Enlightenment monarchs. False but influential letters depict him as a somewhat more radical philosophe than he probably was. His policies are now known as Josephinism. 

He was a supporter of the arts, and most importantly of composers such as Wolfgang Amadeus Mozart and Antonio Salieri. He died with no surviving children and was succeeded by his younger brother Leopold II.

Early life
Joseph was born in the midst of the early upheavals of the War of the Austrian Succession. His formal education was provided through the writings of David Hume, Edward Gibbon, Voltaire, Jean-Jacques Rousseau, and the Encyclopédistes, and by the example of his contemporary (and sometimes rival) King Frederick II of Prussia. His practical training was conferred by government officials, who were directed to instruct him in the mechanical details of the administration of the numerous states composing the Austrian dominions and the Holy Roman Empire.

Marriages and children

Joseph married Princess Isabella of Parma in October 1760, a union fashioned to bolster the 1756 defensive pact between France and Austria. (The bride's mother, Princess Louise Élisabeth, was the eldest daughter of the incumbent King of France. Isabella's father was Philip, Duke of Parma.) Joseph loved his bride, Isabella, finding her both stimulating and charming, and she sought with special care to cultivate his favor and affection. Isabella also found a best friend and confidant in her husband's sister, Maria Christina, Duchess of Teschen.

The marriage of Joseph and Isabella resulted in the birth of a daughter, Maria Theresa. Isabella was fearful of pregnancy and early death, largely a result of the early loss of her mother. Her own pregnancy proved especially difficult as she suffered symptoms of pain, illness and melancholy both during and afterward, though Joseph attended to her and tried to comfort her. She remained bedridden for six weeks after their daughter's birth. 

Almost immediately on the back of their newfound parenthood, the couple then endured two consecutive miscarriages—an ordeal particularly hard on Isabella—followed quickly by another pregnancy. Pregnancy was again provoking melancholy, fears and dread in Isabella. In November 1763, while six months pregnant, Isabella fell ill with smallpox and went into premature labor, resulting in the birth of their second child, Archduchess Maria Christina, who died shortly after being born. 

Progressively ill with smallpox and strained by sudden childbirth and tragedy, Isabella died the following week. The loss of his beloved wife and their newborn child was devastating for Joseph, after which he felt keenly reluctant to remarry, though he dearly loved his daughter and remained a devoted father to Maria Theresa.

For political reasons, and under constant pressure, in 1765, he relented and married his second cousin, Princess Maria Josepha of Bavaria, the daughter of Charles VII, Holy Roman Emperor, and Archduchess Maria Amalia of Austria. This marriage proved extremely unhappy, albeit brief, as it lasted only two years. 

Though Maria Josepha loved her husband, she felt timid and inferior in his company. Lacking common interests or pleasures, the relationship offered little for Joseph, who confessed he felt no love (nor attraction) for her in return. He adapted by distancing himself from his wife to the point of near total avoidance, seeing her only at meals and upon retiring to bed. Maria Josepha, in turn, suffered considerable misery in finding herself locked in a cold, loveless union. 

Four months after the second anniversary of their wedding, Maria Josepha grew ill and died from smallpox. Joseph neither visited her during her illness nor attended her funeral, though he later expressed regret for not having shown her more kindness, respect, or warmth. One thing the union did provide him was the improved possibility of laying claim to a portion of Bavaria, though this would ultimately lead to the War of the Bavarian Succession.

Joseph never remarried. In 1770, Joseph's only surviving child, the seven-year-old Maria Theresa, became ill with pleurisy and died. The loss of his daughter was deeply traumatic for him and left him grief-stricken and scarred. Lacking children, Joseph II was ultimately succeeded by his younger brother, who became Leopold II.

Co-ruler

Joseph was made a member of the constituted council of state (Staatsrat) and began to draw up minutes for his mother to read. These papers contain the germs of his later policy, and of all the disasters that finally overtook him. He was a friend to religious toleration, anxious to reduce the power of the church, to relieve the peasantry of feudal burdens, and to remove restrictions on trade and knowledge. In these, he did not differ from Frederick, or his own brother and successor Leopold II, all enlightened rulers of the 18th century. He tried to liberate serfs, but that did not last after his death.

Where Joseph differed from great contemporary rulers, and was akin to the Jacobins in the intensity of his belief in the power of the state when directed by reason. As an absolutist ruler, however, he was also convinced of his right to speak for the state uncontrolled by laws, and of the wisdom of his own rule. He had also inherited from his mother the belief of the house of Austria in its "August" quality and its claim to acquire whatever it found desirable for its power or profit. He was unable to understand that his philosophical plans for the molding of humanity could meet with pardonable opposition. 

Joseph was documented by contemporaries as being impressive, but not necessarily likable. In 1760, his arranged consort, the well educated Isabella of Parma, was handed over to him. Joseph appears to have been completely in love with her, but Isabella preferred the companionship of Joseph's sister, Marie Christine of Austria. The overweening character of the Emperor was obvious to Frederick II of Prussia, who, after their first interview in 1769, described him as ambitious, and as capable of setting the world on fire. The French minister Vergennes, who met Joseph when he was traveling incognito in 1777, judged him to be "ambitious and despotic".

After the death of his father in 1765, he became emperor and was made co-regent by his mother in the Austrian dominions. As emperor, he had little true power, and his mother had resolved that neither her husband nor her son should ever deprive her of sovereign control in her hereditary dominions. Joseph, by threatening to resign his place as co-regent, could induce his mother to abate her dislike for religious toleration. 

He could and did place a great strain on her patience and temper, as in the case of the first partition of Poland and the Bavarian War of 1778–1779, but in the last resort the empress spoke the final word. Therefore, until the death of his mother in 1780, Joseph was never quite free to follow his own instincts.

During these years, Joseph traveled much. He met Frederick the Great privately at Neisse in 1769 (later painted in The Meeting of Frederick II and Joseph II in Neisse in 1769), and again at Mährisch-Neustadt in 1770; the two rulers initially got along well. On the second occasion, he was accompanied by Count Kaunitz, whose conversation with Frederick may be said to mark the starting point of the first partition of Poland. To this and to every other measure which promised to extend the dominions of his house, Joseph gave hearty approval. Thus, when Frederick fell severely ill in 1775, Joseph assembled an army in Bohemia which, in the event of Frederick's death, was to advance into Prussia and demand Silesia (a territory Frederick had conquered from Maria Theresa in the War of the Austrian Succession).  However, Frederick recovered, and thereafter became wary and mistrustful of Joseph.

Joseph was also eager to enforce Austria's claim on Bavaria upon the death of the elector Maximilian Joseph in 1777. In April of that year, he paid a visit to his sister the queen of France, Marie Antoinette of Austria, traveling under the name of "Count Falkenstein". He was well received and much flattered by the Encyclopedists, but his observations led him to predict the approaching downfall of the French monarchy, and he was not impressed favorably by the French army or navy.

In 1778, he commanded the troops collected to oppose Frederick, who supported the rival claimant to Bavaria. This was the War of the Bavarian Succession. Real fighting was averted by the unwillingness of Frederick to embark on a new war and by Maria Theresa's determination to maintain peace.  However, the war cost Joseph most of his influence over the other German princes, who were wary of his potential designs on their lands, and looked to Frederick as their protector.

As the son of Francis I, Joseph succeeded him as titular Duke of Lorraine and Bar, which had been surrendered to France on his father's marriage, and titular King of Jerusalem and Duke of Calabria (as a proxy for the Kingdom of Naples).

Sole reign
The death of Maria Theresa on 29 November 1780 left Joseph free to pursue his own policy, and he immediately directed his government on a new course, attempting to realize his ideal of enlightened despotism acting on a definite system for the good of all. 

He undertook the spread of education, the secularization of church lands, the reduction of the religious orders and the clergy, in general, to complete submission to the lay state, the issue of the Patent of Tolerance (1781) providing limited guarantee of freedom of worship, and the promotion of unity by the compulsory use of the German language (replacing Latin or in some instances local languages)—everything which from the point of view of 18th-century philosophy, the Age of Enlightenment, appeared "reasonable". He strove for administrative unity with characteristic haste to reach results without preparation. Joseph carried out measures of the emancipation of the peasantry, which his mother had begun, and abolished serfdom in 1781. 

In 1789, he decreed that peasants must be paid in cash payments rather than labor obligations. These policies were violently rejected by both the nobility and the peasants, since their barter economy lacked money. Joseph also abolished the death penalty in 1787, a reform that remained until 1795.

After the outbreak of the French Revolution in 1789, Joseph sought to help the family of his estranged sister Queen Marie Antoinette of France and her husband King Louis XVI of France. Joseph kept an eye on the development of the revolution, and became actively involved in the planning of a rescue attempt. These plans failed, however, either due to Marie Antoinette's refusal to leave her children behind in favor of a faster carriage or Louis XVI's reluctance to become a fugitive king. 

Joseph died in 1790, making negotiations with Austria about possible rescue attempts more difficult. It was not until 21 June 1791 that an attempt was made, with the help of Count Fersen, a Swedish general who had been favored at the courts of both Marie Antoinette and Joseph. The attempt failed after the King was recognized from the back of a coin. Marie Antoinette became increasingly desperate for help from her homeland, even giving French military secrets to Austria. Nevertheless, even though Austria was at war with France at the time, it refused to directly help the by now completely estranged French Queen.

Administrative policies

When Maria Theresa died, Joseph started issuing edicts, over 6,000 in all, plus 11,000 new laws designed to regulate and reorder every aspect of the empire. The spirit of Josephinism was benevolent and paternal. He intended to make his people happy, but strictly in accordance with his own criteria.

Joseph set about building a rationalized, centralized, and uniform government for his diverse lands, a hierarchy under himself as a supreme autocrat. The personnel of government was expected to be imbued with the same dedicated spirit of service to the state that he himself had. It was recruited without favor for a class or ethnic origins, and promotion was solely by merit. To further uniformity, the emperor made German the compulsory language of official business throughout the Empire, which affected especially the Kingdom of Hungary. The Hungarian assembly was stripped of its prerogatives, and not even called together.

As privy finance minister, Count Karl von Zinzendorf (1739–1813) introduced a uniform system of accounting for state revenues, expenditures, and debts of the territories of the Austrian crown. Austria was more successful than France in meeting regular expenditures and in gaining credit. However, the events of Joseph II's last years also suggest that the government was financially vulnerable to the European wars that ensued after 1792.

Legal reform

The busy Joseph inspired a complete reform of the legal system, abolished brutal punishments and the death penalty in most instances, and imposed the principle of complete equality of treatment for all offenders. He lightened censorship of the press and theatre.

In 1781–82 he extended full legal freedom to serfs. Rentals paid by peasants were to be regulated by officials of the crown and taxes were levied upon all income derived from land. The landlords, however, found their economic position threatened, and eventually reversed the policy. Indeed, in Hungary and Transylvania, the resistance of the magnates was such that Joseph had to content himself for a while with halfway measures. Of the five million Hungarians, 40,000 were nobles, of whom 4,000 were magnates who owned and ruled the land; most of the remainder were serfs legally tied to particular estates. 

After the collapse of the peasant revolt of Horea, 1784–85, in which over a hundred nobles were killed, the emperor acted. His Imperial Patent of 1785 abolished serfdom but did not give the peasants ownership of the land or freedom from dues owed to the landowning nobles. It did give them personal freedom. Emancipation of the peasants from the kingdom of Hungary promoted the growth of a new class of taxable landholders, but it did not abolish the deep-seated ills of feudalism and the exploitation of the landless squatters. Feudalism finally ended in 1848.

To equalize the incidence of taxation, Joseph caused an appraisal of all the lands of the empire to be made so that he might impose a single and egalitarian tax on land. The goal was to modernize the relationship of dependence between the landowners and peasantry, relieve some of the tax burden on the peasantry, and increase state revenues. Joseph looked on the tax and land reforms as being interconnected and strove to implement them at the same time. 

The various commissions he established to formulate and carry out the reforms met resistance among the nobility, the peasantry, and some officials. Most of the reforms were abrogated shortly before or after Joseph's death in 1790; they were doomed to failure from the start because they tried to change too much in too short a time, and tried to radically alter the traditional customs and relationships that the villagers had long depended upon.

In the cities, the new economic principles of the Enlightenment called for the destruction of the autonomous guilds, already weakened during the age of mercantilism. Joseph II's tax reforms and the institution of Katastralgemeinde (tax districts for the large estates) served this purpose, and new factory privileges ended guild rights while customs laws aimed at economic unity. Physiocratic influence also led to the inclusion of agriculture in these reforms.

Education and medicine
To produce a literate citizenry, elementary education was made compulsory for all boys and girls, and higher education on practical lines was offered for a select few. Joseph created scholarships for talented poor students and allowed the establishment of schools for Jews and other religious minorities. In 1784 he ordered that the country change its language of instruction from Latin to German, a highly controversial step in a multilingual empire.

By the 18th century, centralization was the trend in medicine because more and better-educated doctors were requesting improved facilities. Cities lacked the budgets to fund local hospitals, and the monarchy wanted to end costly epidemics and quarantines. Joseph attempted to centralize medical care in Vienna through the construction of a single, large hospital, the famous Allgemeines Krankenhaus, which opened in 1784. Centralization worsened sanitation problems, causing epidemics and a 20% death rate in the new hospital; the city nevertheless became preeminent in the medical field in the next century.

Religion
Joseph's policy of religious "toleration" was the most aggressive of any state in Europe.

Probably the most unpopular of all his reforms was his attempted modernization of the highly traditional Catholic Church, which in medieval times had helped establish the Holy Roman Empire beginning with Charlemagne. Calling himself the guardian of Catholicism, Joseph II struck vigorously at papal power. He tried to make the Catholic Church in his empire the tool of the state, independent of Rome. Clergymen were deprived of the tithe and ordered to study in seminaries under government supervision, while bishops had to take a formal oath of loyalty to the crown. He financed the large increase in bishoprics, parishes, and secular clergy by extensive sales of monastic lands. 

As a man of the Enlightenment he ridiculed the contemplative monastic orders, which he considered unproductive. Accordingly, he suppressed a third of the monasteries (over 700 were closed) and reduced the number of monks and nuns from 65,000 to 27,000. The Church's ecclesiastical tribunals were abolished and marriage was defined as a civil contract outside the jurisdiction of the Church.

Joseph sharply cut the number of holy days to be observed in the Empire and ordered ornamentation in churches to be reduced. He forcibly simplified the manner in which the Mass (the central Catholic act of worship) was celebrated. Opponents of the reforms blamed them for revealing Protestant tendencies, with the rise of Enlightenment rationalism and the emergence of a liberal class of bourgeois officials. Anti-clericalism emerged and persisted, while the traditional Catholics were energized in opposition to the emperor.

Joseph's Patent of Toleration in 1781 was a major shift away from the inquisitive religious policies of the Counter Reformation that were previously predominant in the monarchy. Limited religious freedom of worship was given to major non-Catholic Christian sects, although conversion from Catholicism was still restricted. This was followed by the Edict of Tolerance in 1782, removing many restrictions and regulations on Jews.

The Secularization Decree issued on 12 January 1782 banned several monastic orders not involved in teaching or healing and liquidated 140 monasteries (home to 1484 monks and 190 nuns). The banned monastic orders: Jesuits, Camaldolese, Order of Friars Minor Capuchin, Carmelites, Carthusians, Poor Clares, Order of Saint Benedict, Cistercians, Dominican Order (Order of Preachers), Franciscans, Pauline Fathers and Premonstratensians, and their wealth was taken over by the Religious Fund.

His anticlerical and liberal innovations induced Pope Pius VI to pay him a visit in March 1782. Joseph received the Pope politely and showed himself a good Catholic, but refused to be influenced. On the other hand, Joseph was very friendly to Freemasonry, as he found it highly compatible with his own Enlightenment philosophy, although he apparently never joined the Lodge himself. Freemasonry attracted many anticlericals and was condemned by the Church. 

Joseph's feelings towards religion are reflected in a witticism he once spoke in Paris. While being given a tour of the Sorbonne's library, the archivist took Joseph to a dark room containing religious documents and lamented the lack of light which prevented Joseph from being able to read them. Joseph put the man at rest by saying "Ah, when it comes to theology, there is never much light." Thus, Joseph was undoubtedly a much laxer Catholic than his mother.

In 1789 he issued a charter of religious toleration for the Jews of Galicia, a region with a large Yiddish-speaking traditional Jewish population. The charter abolished communal autonomy whereby the Jews controlled their internal affairs; it promoted Germanization and the wearing of non-Jewish clothing.

Foreign policy

The Habsburg Empire also had a policy of war, expansion, colonization and trade as well as exporting intellectual influences. While opposing Prussia and Turkey, Austria maintained its defensive alliance with France and was friendly to Russia though trying to remove the Danubian Principalities from Russian influence. Mayer argues that Joseph was an excessively belligerent, expansionist leader, who sought to make the Habsburg monarchy the greatest of the European powers. His main goal was to acquire Bavaria, if necessary in exchange for the Austrian Netherlands, but in 1778 and again in 1785 he was thwarted by King Frederick II of Prussia, whom he feared greatly; on the second occasion, a number of other German princes, wary of Joseph's designs on their lands, joined Frederick's side. 

Joseph's travels through Russia in 1780 included a visit with the Russian empress Catherine, which started talks that would later lead to a Russian-Austrian alliance, including an offensive clause to be used against the Ottomans. This was a significant diplomatic development, as it neutralised the previous Russian-Prussian alliance which had threatened the monarchy into peace during the War of the Bavarian Succession. The agreement with Russia would later lead Austria into an expensive and largely futile war with the Turks (1787–1791). Joseph II travelled with only a few servants on horseback as "Count Falkenstein". He preferred to stop at a regular inn - forcing Catherine II to convert a wing of her palace, cajoling her gardener to act as inn-keeper.

Joseph's participation in the Ottoman war was reluctant, attributable not to his usual acquisitiveness, but rather to his close ties to Russia, which he saw as the necessary price to be paid for the security of his people. After initial defeats, the Austrians won a string of victories in 1789, including the capture of Belgrade, a key Turkish fortress in the Balkans. These victories however would not amount to any significant gains for the monarchy. Under the threat of Prussian intervention and with the worrying state of the revolution in France, the Treaty of Sistova of 1791 ended the war with only token gains.

The Balkan policy of both Maria Theresa and Joseph II reflected the Cameralism promoted by Prince Kaunitz, stressing consolidation of the borderlands by reorganization and expansion of the military frontier. Transylvania was incorporated into the frontier in 1761 and the frontier regiments became the backbone of the military order, with the regimental commander exercising military and civilian power. "Populationistik" was the prevailing theory of colonization, which measured prosperity in terms of labor. Joseph II also stressed economic development. Habsburg influence was an essential factor in Balkan development in the last half of the 18th century, especially for the Serbs and Croats.

Reaction

Multiple interferences with old customs began to produce unrest in all parts of his dominions. Meanwhile, Joseph threw himself into a succession of foreign policies, all aimed at aggrandizement, and all equally calculated to offend his neighbors—all taken up with zeal, and dropped in discouragement. He endeavored to get rid of the Barrier Treaty, which debarred his Flemish subjects from the navigation of the Scheldt. When he was opposed by France, he turned to other schemes of alliance with the Russian Empire for the partition of the Ottoman Empire and the Republic of Venice. These plans also had to be given up in the face of the opposition of neighbors, and in particular of France. Then Joseph resumed his attempts to obtain Bavaria—this time by exchanging it for the Austrian Netherlands—and only provoked the formation of the Fürstenbund, organized by Frederick II of Prussia.

Nobility throughout his empire was largely opposed to his policies on taxes and his egalitarian and despotic attitudes. In the Austrian Netherlands and Hungary everyone resented the way he tried to do away with all regional government, and to subordinate everything to his own personal rule in Vienna. The ordinary people were not happy. They loathed the Emperor's interference in every detail of their daily lives. As it seems, Joseph was reforming the policies of the Habsburg empire based on his own criteria and personal inclinations rather than for the good of the people. From many of Joseph's regulations, enforced by the secret police, it looked to the Austrians as though Joseph were trying to reform their characters as well as their institutions. Only a few weeks before Joseph's death, the director of the Imperial Police reported to him: "All classes, and even those who have the greatest respect for the sovereign, are discontented and indignant."

In Lombardy (in northern Italy), the cautious reforms of Maria Theresa enjoyed support from local reformers. Joseph II, however, by creating a powerful imperial officialdom directed from Vienna, undercut the dominant position of the Milanese principate and the traditions of jurisdiction and administration. In the place of provincial autonomy, he established an unlimited centralism, which reduced Lombardy politically and economically to a fringe area of the Empire. As a reaction to these radical changes, the middle-class reformers shifted away from cooperation to strong resistance. From this basis appeared the beginnings of the later Lombard liberalism.

In 1784, Joseph II attempted to make German an official language in Hungary after he had renamed the Burgtheater in Vienna the German National Theatre in 1776. Ferenc Széchényi responded by convening of a meeting and said there: "We'll see whether his patriotism also passes to the Crown." Julius Keglević responded with a letter in German to Joseph II: "I write German, not because of the instruction, Your Grace, but because I have to do with a German citizen." The "German citizen" Joseph II let them bring the Holy Crown of Hungary to Vienna, where he gave the keys of the chest in which the Crown was locked to the Crown guards Joseph Keglević and Miklos Nádasdy. Joseph refrained from staging a coronation, and Ferenc Széchényi pulled out of politics. The  Austrian Civil Code, also called Joseph's Civil Code, the predecessor of the Civil Code of Austria, which applies to all citizens equally, was published on 1 November 1786 after 10 years working on it since 1776. § 1: "Every subject expects from the territorial prince security and protection, so it is the duty of the territorial prince, the rights of subjects to determine clearly and to guide the way of the actions how it is needed by universal and special prosperity." It is a clear distinction between the rights of subjects and the duties of the territorial prince and not vice versa. "Territorial prince" (Landesfürst) does not mean "people’s prince" (Volksfürst). In Hungary, there was no codified civil code until 1959. The Crown was brought back to Hungary in 1790, on this occasion the people held a mass celebration. One reason for his refusal to be crowned with the Holy Crown of Hungary might have been that Alcuin had written in a letter to Charlemagne in 798: "And those people should not be listened to who keep saying the voice of the people is the voice of God, since the riotousness of the crowd is always very close to madness."

By 1790, rebellions had broken out in protest against Joseph's reforms in the Austrian Netherlands (the Brabant Revolution) and Hungary, and his other dominions were restive under the burdens of his war with the Ottomans. His empire was threatened with dissolution, and he was forced to sacrifice some of his reform projects. On 30 January 1790, he formally withdrew almost all his reforms in Hungary.

Death
In November 1788, Joseph returned to Vienna  with ruined health and was left abandoned. His minister Kaunitz refused to visit his sick-room and did not see him for two years. His brother Leopold remained at Florence. At last, Joseph, worn out and broken-hearted, recognized that his servants could not, or would not, carry out his plans.

Joseph died on 20 February 1790. He is buried in tomb number 42 in the Imperial Crypt in Vienna. He asked that his epitaph read: "Here lies a ruler who, despite his best intentions, was unsuccessful in all of his endeavors." (Hier liegt ein Fürst, der trotz der besten Meinung keiner seiner Pläne durchsetzen konnte in German original). 

Joseph was succeeded by his brother Leopold II.

Memory and legacy

Biographer Derek Beales ranked Joseph II as one of the three great Enlightenment monarchs with Catherine the Great of Russia and Frederick the Great of Prussia.

The legacy of Josephinism would live on through the Austrian Enlightenment. To an extent, Joseph II's enlightenment beliefs were exaggerated by the author of what Joseph II historian Derek Beales calls the "false Constantinople letters". Long considered genuine writings of Joseph II, these forged works have erroneously augmented the emperor's memory for centuries. These legendary quotations have created a larger-than-life impression of Joseph II as a Voltaire and Diderot-like philosophe, more radical than he probably was.

In 1849, the Hungarian Declaration of Independence declared that Joseph II was not a true King of Hungary as he was never crowned, thus any act from his reign was null and void.

In 1888, Hungarian historian Henrik Marczali published a three-volume study of Joseph, the first important modern scholarly work on his reign, and the first to make systematic use of archival research. Marczali was Jewish and a product of the bourgeois-liberal school of historiography in Hungary, and he portrayed Joseph as a Liberal hero. The Russian scholar Pavel Pavlovich Mitrofanov published a thorough biography in 1907 that set the standard for a century after it was translated into German in 1910. The Mitrofanov interpretation was highly damaging to Joseph: he was not a populist emperor and his liberalism was a myth; Joseph was not inspired by the ideas of the Enlightenment but by pure power politics. He was more despot than his mother. Dogmatism and impatience were the reasons for his failures.

P. G. M. Dickson noted that Joseph II rode roughshod over age-old aristocratic privileges, liberties, and prejudices, thereby creating for himself many enemies, and they triumphed in the end. Joseph's attempt to reform the Hungarian lands illustrates the weakness of absolutism in the face of well-defended feudal liberties. Behind his numerous reforms lay a comprehensive program influenced by the doctrines of enlightened absolutism, natural law, mercantilism, and physiocracy. With a goal of establishing a uniform legal framework to replace heterogeneous traditional structures, the reforms were guided at least implicitly by the principles of freedom and equality and were based on a conception of the state's central legislative authority. Joseph's accession marks a major break since the preceding reforms under Maria Theresa had not challenged these structures, but there was no similar break at the end of the Josephinian era. The reforms initiated by Joseph II were continued to varying degrees under his successor Leopold and later successors, and given an absolute and comprehensive "Austrian" form in the Allgemeine Bürgerliche Gesetzbuch of 1811. They have been seen as providing a foundation for subsequent reforms extending into the 20th century, handled by much better politicians than Joseph II.

The Austrian-born American scholar Saul K. Padover reached a wide American public with his colorful The Revolutionary Emperor: Joseph II of Austria (1934). Padover celebrated Joseph's radicalism, saying his "war against feudal privileges" made him one of the great "liberators of humanity". Joseph's failures were attributed to his impatience and lack of tact, and his unnecessary military adventures, but despite all this Padover claimed the emperor was the greatest of all Enlightenment monarchs. While Padover depicted a sort of New Deal Democrat, Nazi historians in the 1930s made Joseph a precursor of Adolf Hitler.

A new era of historiography began in the 1960s. American Paul Bernard rejected the German national, radical, and anticlerical images of Joseph and instead emphasized long-run continuities. He argued that Joseph's reforms were well suited to the needs of the day. Many failed because of economic backwardness and Joseph's unfortunate foreign policy. British historian Tim Blanning stressed profound contradictions inherent in his policies that made them a failure.  For example, Joseph encouraged small-scale peasant holdings, thus retarding economic modernization that only the large estates could handle. French historian Jean Berenger concludes that despite his many setbacks, Joseph's reign "represented a decisive phase in the process of the modernization of the Austrian Monarchy". The failures came because he "simply wanted to do too much, too fast". Szabo concludes that by far the most important scholarship on Joseph is by Derek Beales, appearing over three decades and based on exhaustive searches in many archives. Beales looks at the emperor's personality, with its arbitrary behavior and mixture of affability and irascibility. Beales shows that Joseph genuinely appreciated Mozart's music and greatly admired his operas. Like most other scholars, Beales has a negative view of Joseph's foreign policies.  Beales finds that Joseph was despotic in the sense of transgressing established constitutions and rejecting sound advice, but not despotic in the sense of any gross abuse of power.

Popular memory
Joseph's image in popular memory has been varied. After his death there were many monuments to him built by the central government across his lands. The first Czechoslovak Republic tore down the monuments when it became independent in 1918. While the Czechs credited Joseph II with educational reforms, religious toleration, and the easing of censorship, they condemned his policies of centralization and Germanization that they blamed for causing a decline in Czech culture.

The Budapest District of Józsefváros was named for the Emperor in 1777 and bears this name up to the present.

Patron of the arts
Like many of the "enlightened despots" of his time, Joseph was a lover and patron of the arts and is remembered as such. He was known as the "Musical King" and steered Austrian high culture towards a more Germanic orientation. He commissioned the German-language opera Die Entführung aus dem Serail from Mozart. The young Ludwig van Beethoven was commissioned to write a funeral cantata for him, but it was not performed because of its technical difficulty.

Joseph is prominently featured in Peter Shaffer's play Amadeus and the movie based upon it. In the film version, he is portrayed by actor Jeffrey Jones as a well-meaning but somewhat befuddled monarch of limited but enthusiastic musical skill, easily manipulated by Salieri; however, Shaffer has made it clear his play is fiction in many respects and not intended to portray historical reality. Joseph was portrayed by Danny Huston in the 2006 film Marie Antoinette.

Joseph also converted Vienna's defensive glacis into public park. The medieval walls defending Vienna's historic center were surrounded by a ditch and glacis about 500m wide, which were kept clear of vegetation and buildings for defensive purposes. Under Joseph the ditch was filled and carriage drives and walkways were built through the glacis, and the area planted with ornamental trees and provided with lanterns and benches. This green public space persisted until the second half of the 19th century, when the Ringstrasse and its associated buildings were built there.

Ancestry

See also
 Edict on Idle Institutions
 Family tree of the German monarchs
 Patent of Toleration

References

Works cited

Further reading
 
 
 Blanning, T. C. W. Joseph II (1994), 228 pp; a short scholarly biography
 Blanning, T. C. W. Joseph II and Enlightened Despotism (1984)
 Bright, James Franck. Joseph II (1897), 222 pp full text online
 
 
 Henderson, Nicholas. "Joseph II", History Today, 1991 41 (March): pp. 21–27. 
 Macek, Bernhard A. Die Kroenung Josephs II. in Frankfurt am Main. Logistisches Meisterwerk, zeremonielle Glanzleistung und Kulturgueter fuer die Ewigkeit (2010) .
 
 
 Vovk, Justin C. (2010). In Destiny's Hands: Five Tragic Rulers, Children of Maria Theresa. iUniverse: Bloomington, Ind.  
 Wilson, Peter H. Absolutism in Central Europe (2000) online edition

External links

 The Austrians: A Thousand-Year Odyssey
 Collectio ordinationum imperatoris Josephi II-i et repraesentationum diversorum regni Hungariae comitatuum Pars 1. Dioszeg: Paul Medgyes, 1790. 318 p. - available at ULB's Digital Library
 Constituta regia quae regnante August, Imperatore et rege Apostol. Josepho II. politicorum Pars 1., 2. (1.) De publicorum negotiorum administratione, (2.) De Politia .... Viennae: Kurzbek, 1788. 397 s. - available at ULB's Digital Library

Regnal titles

|-

|-

|-

1741 births
1790 deaths
18th-century Holy Roman Emperors
18th-century archdukes of Austria
Austrian Roman Catholics
Burials at the Imperial Crypt
House of Habsburg-Lorraine
Wolfgang Amadeus Mozart's employers and patrons
18th-century composers
18th-century male musicians
18th-century Roman Catholics
Authoritarianism 
People of the War of the Bavarian Succession
Grand Masters of the Order of the Golden Fleece
Knights of the Golden Fleece of Austria
Recipients of the Military Order of Maria Theresa
Grand Crosses of the Order of Saint Stephen of Hungary
Dukes of Carniola
Children of Maria Theresa
Sons of emperors